Lamentation is a historical mystery novel by British author C. J. Sansom. It is his eighth novel and the sixth entry in the Matthew Shardlake Series, following 2010's Heartstone. Set in the summer of 1546, King Henry VIII is dying while the Catholic and Protestant factions of his court are battling for power over his successor, Prince Edward. Matthew Shardlake is deep in work and still feeling the shock of the events of the previous year when Queen Catherine Parr, caught in the throes of the power struggle, again seeks his aid when a potentially controversial manuscript, Lamentation of a Sinner, is stolen from her chambers.

In 2021, BBC Radio 4 aired a full-cast adaptation of the novel, dramatised by Colin MacDonald, with Justin Salinger starring as Shardlake.

Reception
Critical reception for Lamentation has been positive. Alfred Hickling writing for The Guardian compared the book's theme to that of Sansom's previous novel Dominion and noted that "Sansom's recent foray into alternate history was not quite as much of a diversion as it first appeared. ...both novels address the critical moment when a tyrant weakens and a ruthless power struggle develops to fill the vacuum."

The Independent's Jane Jakeman wrote that "Sansom brilliantly conveys the uncertainty of the time when a frail young prince would ascend the throne with different factions fighting for regency" and The Spectator's Alan Judd gave a particularly glowing review writing that "The orchestration of plot over 600 pages, and the final twist, is literary craft of a high order" and concluding his review by writing "With the Shardlake series, and with this volume in particular, Sansom has surely established himself as one of the best novelists around."

References

2014 British novels
British crime novels
Novels by C. J. Sansom
Novels set in the 1540s
British historical novels
Macmillan Publishers books